Bitsy or Bitsie may refer to:

Nickname
Bryan Grant (1909–1986), American tennis player
Bitsy Mott (1918–2001), American Major League Baseball backup infielder, later personal security manager of Elvis Presley
Elizabeth Tulloch (born 1981), American actress nicknamed "Bitsie"

Fictional characters
Bitsy Brandenham, a major character in the TV series Central Park
Bitsy Davidson, an occasional character on the soap opera All My Children
Bitsy Mae Harling, a major character in the 2008 TV series Sordid Lives: The Series
Bitsy Johnson, a character in the TV series Ned's Declassified School Survival Guide
Bitsy von Muffling, an occasional character in the TV series Sex and the City
Bitsy, one of the four protagonists in SuperKitties
Bitsy, a hand puppet spider in the British children's programme Paperplay
Bitsy, a family dog in the comic strip Marvin

Feminine given names
Nicknames